Hunger Pains is the debut album from Muph & Plutonic and was released on 20 October 2004. It received national airplay on Triple J radio station.

Reception 

Triple J's reviewer described Hunger Pains "Putting their experiences and talents together to honestly reflect Australian life as they see it, Muph + Plutonic sample, scratch and rap their way through tracks."

Track listing

 "Intro" - 0:32  
 "Work Hard" - 3:13  
 Skit - 0:12  
 "Heaps Good" - 4:01  
 "Raise Ya Voice" (feat. Nicola) - 3:53  
 "Gimme Tha Mic" - 3:32  
 "Beer Goggles" - 4:18  
 "Moment of Clarity" - 4:09  
 "The Jason Chapman Sway" - 3:08  
 "Scars and Stains" (feat. Minas of Art of War) - 3:39  
 "Becoming Agrophobic" - 4:17  
 "Hunger Pains (feat. Raph Boogie of Mnemonic Ascent) - 3:48  
 "Paracetamol" - 4:27  
 "Your Choice 'Kings'" (feat. The Grouch of Living Legends) - 4:36

References 

2004 debut albums
Muph & Plutonic albums
Obese Records albums